A castellum in Latin is usually:

 a distribution, header and settling tank in a Roman aqueduct or castellum aquae.

It is the source of the English word "castle".

References

Roman fortifications
Roman aqueducts